Thomas George Nelson (November 14, 1936 – May 4, 2011) was a United States circuit judge of the United States Court of Appeals for the Ninth Circuit from 1990 to 2004.

Education and career
Born and raised in Idaho Falls, Idaho, Nelson graduated from Idaho Falls High School on 1955 and attended the University of Idaho in Moscow. He was a member of Delta Tau Delta fraternity, and received a Bachelor of Laws from its College of Law in 1962. Nelson served as assistant state attorney general and chief deputy state attorney general from 1963 to 1965. He was in the Idaho Air National Guard from 1962 to 1965 and the United States Army Reserve from 1965 to 1968. He served in the Judge Advocate General's Corps and was a first lieutenant. He was in private practice of law in Twin Falls from 1965 to 1990.

Federal judicial service
In 1990, Nelson was nominated to the United States Court of Appeals for the Ninth Circuit by President George H. W. Bush on July 18 for the seat vacated by the death of J. Blaine Anderson in 1988. Nelson was confirmed by the U.S. Senate on October 12 and received his commission on October 17, 1990. He was on the bench for thirteen years when he assumed senior status on July 14, 2004.

Death
Nelson died at age 74 on May 4, 2011, and is buried at the Idaho State Veterans Cemetery in Boise.

References

External links

FJC Bio

1936 births
2011 deaths
Judges of the United States Court of Appeals for the Ninth Circuit
United States Army Judge Advocate General's Corps
United States court of appeals judges appointed by George H. W. Bush
20th-century American judges
United States Army officers
University of Idaho alumni
Idaho lawyers
People from Twin Falls, Idaho
People from Idaho Falls, Idaho
University of Idaho College of Law alumni
Idaho National Guard personnel